In mathematics, a Tschirnhaus transformation, also known as Tschirnhausen transformation, is a type of mapping on polynomials developed by Ehrenfried Walther von Tschirnhaus in 1683.

Simply, it is a method for transforming a polynomial equation of degree  with some nonzero intermediate coefficients, such that some or all of the transformed intermediate coefficients, are exactly zero.

More generally, it may be defined conveniently by means of field theory, as the transformation on minimal polynomials implied by a different choice of primitive element. This is the most general transformation of an irreducible polynomial that takes a root to some rational function applied to that root.

Definition 

Example: Tschirnhaus' method for cubic equations 
In Tschirnhaus' 1683 paper, he solved the equationusing the Tschirnhaus transformationSubstituting yields the transformed equationorSetting  yields,and finally the Tschirnhaus transformationWhich may be substituted into  to yield an equation of the form:
Tschirnhaus went on to describe how a Tschirnhaus transformation of the form:
may be used to eliminate two coefficients in a similar way.

Generalization 

,

We have

where  is  modulo . There will be other choices  of primitive element in : for any such choice of  we will have by definition:

,

Therefore the set of all Tschirnhaus transformations of an irreducible polynomial is to be described as running over all ways of changing , but leaving  the same. This concept is used in reducing quintics to Bring–Jerrard form, for example.

History 

In his paper, Tschirnhaus referenced a method by Descartes to reduce a quadratic polynomial  such that the  term has zero coefficient.

In 1786, this work was expanded by E. S. Bring who showed that any generic quintic polynomial could be similarly reduced.

See also
Polynomial transformations
Monic polynomial
Reducible polynomial
Quintic function
Galois theory
Abel-Ruffini theorem

References

Polynomials
Field (mathematics)